Dave Patania is a nationally known fitness contributor for WTHR in Indianapolis, Indiana.  He reports weekly on topics of a fitness nature.  Patania also played wide receiver for the Cincinnati Bearcats in the early 1990s
.

References 

American television reporters and correspondents
Cincinnati Bearcats football players
Living people
Year of birth missing (living people)